The 2018 Boels Rental Ladies Tour also known as the 2018 Holland Ladies Tour is the 21st edition of the Holland Ladies Tour, a women's cycle stage race held in the Netherlands. The tour is part of the 2018 women's road cycling calendar and is part of the UCI Women's World Tour.

Stages

Classification leadership

See also

 2018 in women's road cycling

References

External links
 

Boels Rental Ladies Tour
Boels Rental Ladies Tour
Holland Ladies Tour
Cycling in Arnhem
Cycling in Gennep
Cycling in Nijmegen
Cycling in Roosendaal
Cycling in Sittard-Geleen
Cycling in Weert